Robert F. Murphy (January 24, 1899 – January 9, 1976) was an American politician who was a member of the Massachusetts House of Representatives. In 1949 Murphy became the first Democrat to serve as the Majority Leader of the Massachusetts House of Representatives. Murphy also served as the 59th Lieutenant Governor of Massachusetts from January 1957 to October 6, 1960, when he was appointed by political foe Foster Furcolo to take over the scandal-ridden Metropolitan District Commission. Murphy was the son of Franklin E. Murphy, a telegrapher from Danvers, Massachusetts. Robert's mother, Alice Murphy, worked as a milliner in Boston.

See also
 Massachusetts legislature: 1943–1944, 1945–1946, 1947–1948, 1949–1950, 1951–1952, 1953–1954

References

Bibliography
 New York Times, Robert F Murphy, Mass Lt Gov, '56–60, dies Jan 9 in Malden (Mass) at 76. Served 6 terms in Mass Legis and in '49 became Dem party's 1st majority leader in House, Page 45, Column 2 (January 11, 1976).
 1947 1948 Public officers of the Commonwealth of Massachusetts, Boston, MA: Commonwealth of Massachusetts, 1947, p. 243.

1976 deaths
Politicians from Somerville, Massachusetts
Democratic Party members of the Massachusetts House of Representatives
Lieutenant Governors of Massachusetts
1899 births
20th-century American politicians